is a train station in Nishinari-ku, Osaka, Osaka Prefecture, Japan, operated by the private railway operator Nankai Electric Railway.

Lines
Kizugawa Station is served by the Koya Line (Shiomibashi Branch), and has the station number "NK06-3".

Adjacent stations

See also
 List of railway stations in Japan

References

External links

  

Railway stations in Osaka Prefecture